Brendan Gan Seng Ling (born 3 June 1988) is a professional footballer who plays as a central midfielder and captain for Malaysia Super League club Selangor and the Malaysia national team.

Club career

Brendan began playing football for his local club, the Marton Hammers before signing for the Sutherland Sharks in 2000 when he was twelve years old, progressing through their youth grades to make his senior debut for the club in 2008. He made 15 league appearances scoring 6 goals, and 3 appearances in the Finals Series. It was this debut season that shot Gan to prominence within the local media which brought with it a growing reputation to match. He did not disappoint with dazzling performances week in week out which eventually led him to being crowned the New South Wales Premier League player of the year, winning the Gold Medal award for the competition.

Sydney FC

He was signed by Sydney FC for their inaugural National Youth League squad ahead of competition from rival A-League clubs.

On 28 November 2008, Gan made his debut for Sydney FC against Queensland Roar with a 5-minute cameo where he turned heads.

On 7 December, he scored the winning goal in the 78th minute for Sydney FC against the Newcastle Jets to give them their first win in 7 games.

Gan was given his full senior debut on 13 December against Central Coast Mariners. He scored his second senior goal against Melbourne Victory with a long range strike from outside the penalty area.

Gan scored his third senior goal against Wellington Phoenix with a powerful header from a corner. This goal gave Sydney FC a 2–0 win over Wellington and placed them on the top of the table, leapfrogging Gold Coast United.

On 2 December 2010, in only his second start for the season, he scored the opening goal in a 3–1 win, once again against Wellington Phoenix.

He was released from Sydney, along with several other players at the end of Sydney's 2011 Asian Champions League campaign.

Bonnyrigg White Eagles

Gan signed for Bonnyrigg White Eagles in the NSW Premier League, and made his debut in the Round 15 game against Sydney United.

Sabah FA

On 17 November 2011, Brendan joined the Malaysian club, Sabah as one of the two foreign players allowed in the 2012 Malaysia Super League. Brendan, alongside his fellow countrymen, Michael Baird signed a one-year contract with Sabah.

Rockdale City Suns

Brendan signed with Rockdale City Suns FC  NSW Premier League the next season since no contract extension was offered by Sabah. With this opportunity, he confirmed his intention to return to the A-League.

Kelantan FA

In November 2013, Brendan returned to Malaysia and signed a three-year contract with Kelantan. He was supposed to be registered as a local player for Kelantan but did not get the approval from FAM because according to FAM any player to be registered as a local player is required to have Malaysian identity card or passport. On 6 April, he officially obtained an identity card and was registered by Kelantan as a local player on April transfer window.

He made his debut during the match between Kelantan against Terengganu which ended 1–1. In the first match of the 2015 Malaysia Super League Gan suffered a serious torn ACL in his right knee that would keep him out for most of the 2015 season. In September 2016 Gan suffered another ACL injury, this time in his left knee which keep him out for 10 months, ruling him out for the 2016 AFF Championship.

Selangor 

On 1 December 2019, Brendan officially joined Malaysia Super League club Selangor. On July 2021, Brendan was diagnosed with cancer and missed the rest of season. In June 2022, he made his return in a 7-0 over Sarawak United, scoring a brace. He was appointed as Selangor’s captain since 2021.

International career

Brendan made his first appearances with Malaysia as an overage player with the under 23 team against Yemen in a preparation for the 2014 Asian Games. He later debuted for Malaysia senior team on 24 March 2016 in a 2018 FIFA World Cup qualification match against Saudi Arabia. He scored his first international goal in a 2-1 victory over Thailand during the 2022 World Cup qualification.

Personal life
Brendan was born in Australia to an Australian mother and Malaysian father from Seremban, Negeri Sembilan.

Career statistics

Club statistics

International

International goals
''As of match played 14 November 2019. Malaysia score listed first, score column indicates score after each Brendan goal.

Honours
Kelantan
 Malaysia Cup runner-up: 2013

Perak
 Malaysia Cup: 2018
 Malaysia FA Cup runner-up : 2019

Selangor
 Malaysia Cup runner-up: 2022

Malaysia
King's Cup runner-up: 2022

References

1988 births
Living people
Australian sportspeople of Chinese descent
Australian people of Malaysian descent
A-League Men players
Sydney FC players
People from the Sutherland Shire
Soccer players from Sydney
Bonnyrigg White Eagles FC players
Sabah F.C. (Malaysia) players
Rockdale Ilinden FC players
Kelantan FA players
Malaysia Super League players
Association football defenders
Footballers at the 2014 Asian Games
People who lost Australian citizenship
Australian emigrants to Malaysia
Citizens of Malaysia through descent
Malaysian sportspeople of Chinese descent
Malaysian footballers
Malaysian expatriate footballers
Asian Games competitors for Malaysia